Cyperochloeae is a small tribe of grasses in the Panicoideae subfamily, found in Australia. It belongs to a basal lineage within the subfamily and has only two species in two monotypic genera, Cyperochloa and Spartochloa. They use the C3 photosynthetic pathway.

References

External links

Panicoideae
Poaceae tribes